Chelsham and Farleigh is a civil parish in the Tandridge District of Surrey, England. Other than the villages of Chelsham and Farleigh, the parish also includes the hamlet of Fickleshole. The parish was created on 1 April 1969 as an amalgamation of its two named small villages.

History
Farleigh was an ancient parish and Chelsham was a chapelry of the parish of Warlingham, both within the Tandridge Hundred of Surrey. Both became civil parishes in the Godstone poor law union, and were part of the Godstone registration and rural sanitary district.

When the Godstone Rural District was created in 1894 it included the parishes of Chelsham and Farleigh, each with a parish council. In 1933 as part of a county review order, Farleigh parish was transferred to Coulsdon and Purley Urban District and the parish council was abolished. As part of the review  of Chelsham parish was transferred to Caterham and Warlingham Urban District.  of Farleigh parish was transferred to the County Borough of Croydon in 1936.

In 1965 Coulsdon and Purley Urban District was abolished and Farleigh became part of the London Borough of Croydon in Greater London. However, some adjustments were made to the Greater London boundary and the civil parish of Chelsham and Farleigh was created on 1 April 1969. It was formed as a parish in Godstone Rural District, as an amalgamation of the parish of Chelsham with the former parish of Farleigh. Godstone Rural District was abolished on 1 April 1974 and the civil parish became part of the Tandridge District.

Government
Chelsham and Farleigh Parish Council is the local council for the parish. The council meets at Farleigh Hall, in Farleigh. The parish has seven councillors. It is divided into the two wards of Chelsham and Farleigh. Chelsham ward elects five councillors and Farleigh ward has two councillors. The parish clerk is M S Turner. For elections to the Surrey County Council the parish is part of the Warlingham electoral division, electing one county councillor. For elections to the Tandridge District Council the parish is part of the Warlingham East and Chelsham and Farleigh ward, electing three district councillors.

Geography
It is predominantly rural open land in the Metropolitan Green Belt. The parish includes the settlements of Chelsham, Farleigh and Fickleshole. The boundaries abut the built-up areas of New Addington and Selsdon to the north, Warlingham and Woldingham to the west, and Biggin Hill to the east. Postal addresses in the parish fall under the CR6 postcode district of the Warlingham post town.

Demography and housing

The average level of accommodation in the region composed of detached houses was 28%, the average that was apartments was 22.6%.

The proportion of households in the civil parish who owned their home outright compares to the regional average of 35.1%.  The proportion who owned their home with a loan compares to the regional average of 32.5%.  The remainder lived in rented dwellings (plus a negligible percentage of households living rent-free).

References

External links

Civil parishes in Surrey
1969 establishments in England
Tandridge